Salvan Browne (born 19 March 1982) is a Vincentian cricketer. He played in two first-class matches for the Windward Islands in 2008 and 2009.

See also
 List of Windward Islands first-class cricketers

References

External links
 

1982 births
Living people
Saint Vincent and the Grenadines cricketers
Windward Islands cricketers